Stora Skogssjön is a lake in Stockholm County, Södermanland, Sweden.  It lies just north of the smaller Lilla Skogssjön.

Lakes of Stockholm County